Norbert Tyrajski (born 24 May 1975) is a former professional football goalkeeper, most well known for his appearances for Lech Poznań with whom he won the Polish Cup in 2004.

References

1975 births
Living people
Polish footballers
Association football goalkeepers
Warta Poznań players
Widzew Łódź players
Lech Poznań players
Wisła Płock players
Ekstraklasa players
II liga players
Polish expatriate footballers
Expatriate footballers in Greece